Aburi Botanical Gardens is a garden in Aburi  in Eastern region of Ghana 

The garden occupies an area of 64.8 hectares. It was opened in March, 1890 and was founded by Governor William Brandford-Griffith and Dr John Farrell Easmon, a Sierra Leonean medical doctor. Before the garden was established, it was the site of a sanatorium built in 1875 for Gold Coast government officials. During the governorship of William Brandford-Griffith, a Basel missionary and Jamaican Moravian, Alexander Worthy Clerk, supervised clearing of land around the sanatorium to start the Botanic Department. In 1890 William Crowther, a student from the Royal Botanic Gardens, Kew, was appointed the garden's first curator. The gardens played an important role in encouraging cocoa production in South Ghana, by supplying cheap cocoa seedlings and information about scientific farming methods. After Hevea brasiliensis was sent to Aburi from Kew in 1893, the gardens also encouraged rubber production in Ghana.

Gallery

References

Botanical gardens in Ghana
1890 establishments in Gold Coast (British colony)